HIP 14810 c is an extrasolar planet approximately 165 light-years away in the constellation of Aries. This planet has mass at least 1.28 times that of Jupiter and orbits at 0.545 AU in an eccentric orbit. The planet was discovered by the N2K Consortium in 2006 and announced in a paper published in 2007. With the discovery of a third planet in the system which was announced in 2009, the parameters of this planet were revised.

References

External links
 
 

Aries (constellation)
Exoplanets discovered in 2006
Giant planets
Exoplanets detected by radial velocity